Schönefeld (meaning beautiful field) is a suburban municipality in the Dahme-Spreewald district, Brandenburg, Germany. It borders the southeastern districts of Berlin. The municipal area encompasses the old Berlin Schönefeld Airport (SXF) and the new Berlin Brandenburg Airport (BER).

Geography

In the north, Schönefeld adjoins to the Berlin boroughs of Tempelhof-Schöneberg, Neukölln, and Treptow-Köpenick with the localities of Lichtenrade, Gropiusstadt, Buckow, Rudow, Altglienicke, and Bohnsdorf. In the south, it borders Mittenwalde, in the west, Blankenfelde-Mahlow and in the east, Schulzendorf and Zeuthen.

Civil parishes
The Schönefeld municipal area comprises six districts (Ortsteile), former municipalities in their own right which were incorporated in 2003:
Schönefeld proper
Großziethen
Selchow
Kiekebusch
Waltersdorf
Waßmannsdorf

The settlement of Kienberg, part of Waltersdorf, was cleared of residents to permit expansion of the Berlin Brandenburg Airport and is to be developed as a commercial area.

History and monuments
The first preserved mention of Schönefeld in the Mittelmark territory dates back to 1242. Sconenfelde, then a possession held by the Lords of Selchow, is documented in the 1375 Landbuch (domesday book) of Emperor Charles IV, when he also ruled as Elector of Brandenburg. The village church, rebuilt in 1904/05 according to plans designed by Franz Heinrich Schwechten, includes a large Baroque altar. Waltersdorf and Waßmannsdorf also have village churches dating to the first half of the 13th century.

From 1933 onwards the Henschel aircraft company moved from Johannisthal Air Field to Schönefeld and had three runways laid out next to the village. More than 14,000 warplanes were built at the site until 1945, when the premises were occupied by the Red Army. In the Großziethen cemetery is a memorial to 200 prisoners of war and forced laborers who died during World War II. The Soviet Air Forces used the air field from 1946, one year later the Soviet Military Administration ordered the buildup of a civil air service supplying East Berlin.

Before German reunification, Schönefeld shared its borders partly with boroughs of former West Berlin (present-day Neukölln and Tempelhof-Schöneberg), and so from 1961 to 1990 it was separated from it by the Berlin Wall.

Demography

Economy and infrastructure

Transport
Berlin-Brandenburg Airport
Flughafen BER - Terminal 5 station, opened in 1951 on the Berlin outer ring, is currently served by the Berlin S-Bahn lines S45 and S9
Berlin Brandenburg Airport railway station beneath the airport Terminal 1 served by S-Bahn, Regional Express "Airport Express" and long distance IC trains, and an S-Bahn station at Waßmannsdorf, between there and the existing Schönefeld station served only by the S-Bahn.
 The Schönefled interchange connects the autobahns A13, A113 with its A117 branch-off, and A10 (Berliner Ring).
 Bundesstraßen B96A and B179

Business
The Airport-Center, an industrial area in Waltersdorf, and Berlin Schönefeld Airport are important sources of revenue for Schönefeld.

The head office of Private Wings is located in the General Aviation Terminal (Allgemeine Luftfahrt) on the property of Schönefeld Airport. Before its disestablishment, the East German airline company Interflug had its head office on the grounds of the airport. Bremenfly also had its head office in Schönefeld.

Politics

Seats in the municipal council (Gemeinderat):
 Alle für Eine voters' association: 5 
 Christian Democratic Union (CDU): 7
 Social Democratic Party of Germany (SPD): 3
 The Left: 2
 Schönefeld citizens' initiative (BIS): 1
 Pro Schönefeld citizens' association: 4

Twin towns — Sister cities
Schönefeld is twinned with  Bayangol, a district of Ulaanbataar, since 1999.

Education
Primary schools in the municipality:
Astrid-Lindgren-Grundschule Schönefeld
Paul-Maar-Grundschule Großziethen

There is a private secondary school, Evangelische Schule Schönefeld.

Notable people
 Rosemarie Clausen, theatrical photographer, born in Großziethen in 1907
 Rudi Dutschke, prominent spokesperson of the German student movement of the 1960s

See also

Berlin-Schönefeld Airport
Berlin Schönefeld Airport station
Berlin-Brandenburg International Airport
BER Airport – Terminal 1-2 station

References

Sources
 Bernd Kuhlmann. Schönefeld bei Berlin – 1 Amt, 1 Flughafen und 11 Bahnhöfe. Berlin: Gesellschaft für Verkehrspolitik und Eisenbahnwesen, 1996.

External links

Localities in Dahme-Spreewald
Teltow (region)